Bella Vista railway station is a rapid transit station built by the Metro Trains Sydney consortium at Lexington Drive, Bella Vista, on the western edge of the Norwest Business Park in Sydney, Australia. The station was built as part of Transport for NSW's Sydney Metro Northwest project to serve future train services to Rouse Hill and Chatswood. The station is planned to eventually serve trains to the Sydney central business district and Bankstown as part of the government's 20-year Sydney's Rail Future strategy.

History

The NSW Government announced a future railway line to Castle Hill, south-east of Bella Vista, as part of its Action for Public Transport strategy in 1998. Bella Vista was to be served by a bus rapid transit connection to the new rail terminus. A longer-term plan presented by Co-ordinator General of Rail Ron Christie three years later included a 'Mungerie Park Line', with a station at Burns Road (now called Memorial Avenue) in Kellyville – about one kilometre north of the present Bella Vista Station site. In the years that followed, Burns Road Station formed part of successive north-western rail proposals, including the Metropolitan Rail Expansion Plan in 2005 and a short-lived metro proposal in 2008.

Burns Road opened as a North West T-way bus station in 2007.

Work on the North West Rail Link got underway with the election of the O'Farrell Government in 2011. As part of the approved proposal, Burns Road Station was replaced with new stops at Lexington Drive, Bella Vista, to the south and Samantha Riley Drive, Kellyville, to the north. The new station opened to passengers 26 May 2019. The station is operated by Metro Trains Sydney, which was also responsible for the design of the station as part of its Operations, Trains and Systems contract with Transport for NSW.

Services

Bella Vista has one island platform with two faces. It is served by Metro North West Line services. Bella Vista station is served by bus route 745 to Glenwood, Stanhope Gardens, Quakers Hill and St Marys, operated by Busways, whilst Hillsbus services to Sydney CBD, North Sydney and Parramatta operate from Celebration T-way.

References

External links
 Bella Vista Station description at Sydney Metro Northwest project website
 Northwest Rapid Transit corporate website
 Bella Vista Station details Transport for New South Wales  (Archived 15 June 2019)

Easy Access railway stations in Sydney
Railway stations in Australia opened in 2019
Sydney Metro stations
Bella Vista, New South Wales
The Hills Shire